Noise for Music's Sake is a double-disc compilation by British band Napalm Death. It was released on 8 July 2003 on Earache Records. This album is a retrospective of the band's entire career. The first disc is a best-of compilation; the second disc contains rarities. The booklet includes 20 pages with interviews of band members Shane Embury and Mark "Barney" Greenway. It also includes a guide to all the songs from the second disc, and a complete "Family Tree" detailing every person who was ever in the band.

Track listing

Disc one

Disc two

Personnel

Napalm Death
Mark "Barney" Greenway – vocals
Jesse Pintado – lead guitar
Mitch Harris – rhythm guitar
Shane Embury – bass
Danny Herrera – drums
Nicholas Bullen – bass, vocals
Mick Harris – drums
Justin Broadrick – guitars
Bill Steer – guitars (disc 2, 22–24)
Lee Dorrian – vocals (disc 2, 21–24)
Jim Whiteley – bass

Technical personnel
 Dan Tobin – compiling
 Shane Embury – compiling
 Mick Kenney – cover illustration, booklet
 Dom Lawson – liner notes
 Mick Usher – Napalm Death family tree

References

Napalm Death compilation albums
2003 compilation albums